Frank Fahey (born 6 June 1951) is an Irish property developer and former  Fianna Fáil politician who served as Minister for the Marine and Natural Resources from 2000 to 2002 and as a Minister of State in various roles. He served as a Teachta Dála (TD) for the Galway West constituency from 1982 to 1992 and 1997 to 2011. He was a Senator for the Labour Panel from 1993 to 1997.

Life before politics
Frank Fahey was born in June 1951 in Galway. He was educated at St Mary's College, Our Lady's College and University College Galway. He was a schoolteacher before he entered politics.

Ministerial career
Fahey was first elected to Dáil Éireann at the February 1982 general election. In 1987, he was appointed by the government of Charles Haughey to the post of Minister of State at the Department of Education with responsibility for Youth and Sport. He was re-appointed in July 1989, with additional responsibility as Minister of State at the Department of Tourism and Transport from September 1989. He was not retained as a minister when Albert Reynolds came to office in February 1992.

He lost his Dáil seat at the 1992 general election and was appointed to Seanad Éireann, serving in the 20th Seanad until 1997. He returned to the Dáil at the 1997 general election and in the new government of Bertie Ahern, he was appointed Minister of State at the Department of Health and Children with responsibility as Minister of State for Children. The role was expanded in 1998 with additional appointments as Minister of State at the Department of Education and Science and at the Department of Justice, Equality and Law Reform. In January 2000, he was appointed to cabinet as Minister for the Marine and Natural Resources.

Following the re-election of the incumbent government at the 2002 general election, Fahey was demoted to the post of Minister of State at the Department of Enterprise, Trade and Employment with responsibility for Labour Affairs. In a reshuffle in 2004, he was appointed as Minister of State at the Department of Justice, Equality and Law Reform with responsibility for Equality.

He was re-elected at the 2007 general election but not appointed to any ministerial office. He was, however, appointed to head the joint Oireachtas committee on Transport.

Controversies

Lost at Sea scheme
While Minister for the Marine and Natural Resources in 2000, Fahey launched the Lost at Sea scheme to compensate fishermen whose vessels had been lost at sea. In 2004, following a complaint from a late applicant (who had been turned down), the Ombudsman Emily O'Reilly recommended to the department that latecomers should be considered, saying that the schemes had a "serious defect" in having contacted some fishing families and not others. Via a freedom of information request, The Sunday Business Post found that Fahey had discussed the scheme with two constituents, who later received three quarters (around €2m) of the overall compensation, prior to the announcement - and had written to them about their successful applications prior to the closing date. In 2007, the Standards in Public Office Commission found no problems with Fahey's conduct. In 2009, the Ombudsman published a full report into the scheme, again recommending that late applicants receive compensation, but it was blocked from discussion in the Oireachtas by the government.

Corrib gas project
In 2000, one of Fahey's last acts as Minister of State for the Marine and Natural Resources was to approve the foreshore licence for the controversial Corrib gas project. In 2002, in connection with this project, he approved the sale of a large area of Irish national forestry at Bellanaboy to Shell Oil for the building of a gas processing site, which caused much controversy.

Investments and property
The Irish Times reported in 2006 that in 1994, when Fahey was a senator, he became involved in establishing a hair and beauty salon business in Moscow, involving an investment of over £200,000 (€254,000). Fahey did not officially declare the interest and at first denied involvement with the salon. Later, he admitted a connection, saying he had travelled to Moscow "as an ordinary citizen to support the investors including my wife who were attempting to set up a hair salon there...the whole thing was part of a regional political campaign by a number of individuals to do damage to my integrity, character and good name".

Fahey has invested in properties in countries including Ireland, France, the US, Dubai and Belgium. He also declared an interest in a construction company and a share portfolio in the Dáil Register of Members Interests.

In June 2009, Green Party leader Trevor Sargent accused Fahey in the Dáil of tax avoidance and making inappropriate decisions as a minister, and called on the Taoiseach to sack him.

Loss of seat
The 2011 general election was disastrous for Fianna Fáil and Fahey lost his seat, his first preference vote declining to 5.7%. He had said in November 2010: "I have no illusions that I will lose my seat". During a public meeting in the run up to the election he and government advisor Alan Aherne were booed and heckled.

References

 

1951 births
Living people
Alumni of the University of Galway
Fianna Fáil TDs
Members of the 23rd Dáil
Members of the 24th Dáil
Members of the 25th Dáil
Members of the 26th Dáil
Members of the 20th Seanad
Members of the 28th Dáil
Members of the 29th Dáil
Members of the 30th Dáil
Ministers of State of the 25th Dáil
Ministers of State of the 26th Dáil
Ministers of State of the 28th Dáil
Ministers of State of the 29th Dáil
Local councillors in County Galway
Politicians from County Galway
Fianna Fáil senators